Gerdakaneh-ye Olya (also Romanized as Gerdakāneh-ye ‘Olyā; also known as Gerdeh Kanī-ye Bālā, Gerdkanī-ye Bālā, Gerdkānī-ye ‘Olyā, and Gīrdehkānī Bāla) is a village in Gavrud Rural District, in the Central District of Sonqor County, Kermanshah Province, Iran. At the 2006 census, its population was 1,051, in 253 families.

References 

Populated places in Sonqor County